Sidequesting is an independent scripted fiction podcast created by Tal Minear and first published in 2019. It is described as a fantasy podcast about avoiding the main plot. The show features a nonbinary asexual main character, and is notable for its LGBTQ+ and disability representation throughout the podcast. Sidequesting also features an international cast of guest voices, including Clint McElroy, Erin B. Lillis, and James Oliva. The title of the show is a reference to video game side quests.

Format 
Sidequesting follows Rion, an adventurer who's willing to help anyone out, as long as they're not being asked to deal with "the scary wizard that everyone keeps talking about". Each episode takes place in a new city or town in a fantasy world, and contains different characters that Rion meets. Episodes are between 10 and 15 minutes long. They can be listened to in any order, though there are story threads that connect across episodes and references that call back to previous stories. The central premise of Sidequesting is that no problem is too small – for example, the central premise of an episode can be as simple as finding a missing object. Instead of relying on high stakes adventure, the show plays with the character interactions of small moments.

Production 
Sidequesting is funded by fans of the show through Patreon and Indiegogo. A breakdown of the second season budget showed that the majority of the funds raised goes to voice actors and writers. Two season of the show have been released, each with 10 episodes, and a third is in production.

Reception 
The show has been praised for its subversion of tropes found in traditional fantasy stories. It is one of three audio dramas to prominently feature deaf and hard of hearing characters.

Awards

References 

Audio podcasts
Fantasy podcasts
American radio dramas
Scripted podcasts
2019 podcast debuts
American podcasts
Patreon creators